, , or  are the common names for a number of species of plant in the family Myrtaceae. 

It may also refer to:

Plants 
 Myrciaria cuspidata
 Myrciaria delicatula
 Myrciaria plinioides
 Myrciaria tenella

See also
 Cambuí (disambiguation)